The third season of Jane the Virgin premiered on The CW on October 17, 2016 and ended on May 22, 2017. The season consisted of 20 episodes and stars Gina Rodriguez as Jane Villanueva a young Latina university student accidentally artificially inseminated with her boss' sperm, Rafael Solano (Justin Baldoni). In this season, Jane marries Michael Cordero, Jr. (Brett Dier) and must deal with married life while Rafael discovers secrets from his past and his ex-wife, Petra Solano (Yael Grobglas), deals with her evil twin sister.

Cast and characters

Main
 Gina Rodriguez as Jane Gloriana Villanueva
 Andrea Navedo as Xiomara "Xo" Gloriana Villanueva
 Yael Grobglas as Petra Solano/Anezka
 Justin Baldoni as Rafael Solano
 Ivonne Coll as Alba Gloriana Villanueva
 Brett Dier as Michael Cordero, Jr.
 Jaime Camil as Rogelio de la Vega

Recurring
 Mia and Ella Allan as Anna and Elsa Solano
 Yara Martinez as Dr. Luisa Alver
 Bridget Regan as Rose Solano / Sin Rostro
 Diane Guerrero as Lina Santillan
 Priscilla Barnes as Magda Andel
 Justina Machado as Darci Factor
 Ricardo Chavira as Bruce
 Johnny Messner as Chuck Chesser
 Alfonso DiLuca as Jorge
 Francisco San Martin as Fabian Regalo del Cielo
 Joseph Sanders as Mateo Solano Villenuveva

Episodes

Ratings

References

2016 American television seasons 
2017 American television seasons